Aquila is a town in the southwest part of the Mexican state of Michoacán.  It is the municipal seat for the municipality of Aquila.  It is 23 mi/43 km southeast of Tecoman.  Its population was 1,915 in 2002.  It is located at Latitude: 18°35'N Longitude: 103°31'W and at elevation 989 ft/510 m.  It has harsh terrain.  Agriculture consists of small farming, mainly for subsistence. There is one paved road south to Mexico Highway 200 (5 mi/11 km away).

Populated places in Michoacán
Nahua settlements